XHACE-FM 91.3/XEACE-AM 1470 is a combo radio station in Mazatlán, Sinaloa, Mexico. It is owned by Grupo Fórmula and carries its talk radio format.

History
XEACE received its first concession in November 1973. It was owned by Pablo Xibillé Partida and maintained the name Radio Éxitos for many years.

XEACE became a combo in 1994. Xibillé died on August 12, 2003, three years after selling the station to Radio Fórmula.

In 2017, XHACE was one of the first stations to change to the new Trión rock format, with Radio Fórmula news programs remaining on the schedule. The station dropped Trión in April 2020.

References

1973 establishments in Mexico
News and talk radio stations in Mexico
Radio Fórmula
Radio stations established in 1973
Radio stations in Sinaloa
Spanish-language radio stations